Anderson Dunn  (born 6 May 1944) is a retired British police officer.

Dunn was adopted by William Rennie and his wife Wilma (née Turner). He joined the Metropolitan Police in London as a constable in 1963 and rose through the ranks. In 1987, he transferred to Thames Valley Police as a chief superintendent, and the following year he was promoted to assistant chief constable (operations). In 1993, he transferred to Northamptonshire Police as deputy chief constable.

On 5 September 1994, he returned to the Metropolitan Police as assistant commissioner and took command of Area No. 3 (North-East Area) following the reorganisation which saw expansion from four to six assistant commissioners, all but one placed in charge of one of the five operational areas. In 1997, he moved to Area No. 2 (North-West Area). In 2000, when the force reverted to having four assistant commissioners each in charge of a portfolio instead of an operational area, he became Assistant Commissioner Strategic Development until he retired the following year.

Dunn was awarded the Queen's Police Medal (QPM) in the 1995 Birthday Honours. He graduated from Queen Mary College, London, with an LLB. He married Margaret Docherty in 1967. They have a son and a daughter.

Footnotes

1944 births
Living people
Assistant Commissioners of Police of the Metropolis
Metropolitan Police recipients of the Queen's Police Medal
Alumni of Queen Mary University of London
British police chief officers